Reese Smith Jr. Field is a baseball venue located on the campus of Middle Tennessee State University in Murfreesboro, Tennessee, United States.  It is home to the Middle Tennessee Blue Raiders baseball team, a member of the Division I Conference USA.  The park was built in 1979 and has a capacity of 2,600 people.  It was renovated in 1989.

The field is named after Reese Smith, Jr., a former baseball player at Middle Tennessee.  The field was officially dedicated to him on April 12, 1983.

Renovations/Features
In 1989, the field was significantly renovated.  Seating capacity was increased to its current 2,600.  Additionally, new backstops and fences were constructed.

Other features of the field include a press box, concessions, bullpens, hitting cages, and an underground sprinkler system.

In 1998, the Stephen B. Smith Clubhouse and Indoor Training Facility was built.  The facility features a lounge, trophy case, lockers, indoor training area, and coaches' offices.  It is attached to the field itself with a brick and iron fence.

See also
 List of NCAA Division I baseball venues

References

Middle Tennessee Blue Raiders baseball
College baseball venues in the United States
Baseball venues in Tennessee
Buildings and structures in Murfreesboro, Tennessee